A number of units of measurement were used in Serbia to measure length, weight, etc.  Metrication was carried out in 1873 in Serbia.

System before metric system

A number of units were used.

Length

One notable unit was archine.  One archine was 28.0 in (0.711 m).

Mass

Some units of mass are given below:

1 litra = 100 drachm

1 oka = 4 litra = 2.8188 lb = 1.2786 kg.

References

Serbian culture
Serbia